Morgenthaler is a family name (or surname) from German speaking Europe.

Origin 
The name Morgenthaler means person from the morning valley. It developed from the description of a person coming from a place called Morning Valley; in ancient German orthography Morgen Thal. The final syllable (or suffix) -er signifies geographical origin of a person (as in English New Yorker). The distribution of the name in Europe and around the world  leads to the conclusion of most probable origins of the name in Switzerland or in southern Germany.

Distribution 
Mainly in Switzerland (with an amassment in two Cantons of Switzerland: Bern and Aargau) and in Germany (with an amassment along the southern Rhine valley). By immigration also in Austria, France, the United States and other countries.

Notable people with the name
 Walter Morgenthaler (1882–1965), Swiss psychiatry
 Otto Morgenthaler (1886–1973)
 Ernst Morgenthaler (1887–1962), a Swiss painter
 George William Morgenthaler American mathematician
 Wendelin Morgenthaler (1888–1963), German politician (CDU)
 Hans Morgenthaler (1890–1928), Swiss poet
 Sasha Morgenthaler (1893–1975)
 Jeanne Morgenthaler (1885–1974), a Swiss Olympic fencer
 Max Morgenthaler (1901–1980)
 Fritz Morgenthaler (1919–1984), a Swiss psychoanalyst, physician and painter
 David Morgenthaler (1919–2016), American businessman, founder of Morgenthaler, U.S. private equity and venture capital firm
 Hans Morgenthaler (German writer) (born 1944), German writer
 Robert Morgenthaler (born 1952), Swiss jazz musician
 Jill Morgenthaler (born 1954), U.S. Army Reserve Colonel, and Illinois politician
 Anders Morgenthaler (born 1972), Danish artist and author
 Wulffmorgenthaler
 Bernhard Morgenthaler (born 1987), Austrian footballer
 Clemens Morgenthaler, German bass-baritone
 Harley Morgenthaler, pharmacist
 Donald Harley Morgenthaler, (1930-2001), pharmacist

See also 
 Mergenthaler
 Morgentaler
 Morgenthau
 Morgenstern (disambiguation)

References

External links 
International Morgenthaler name Website

Archaic words and phrases
Swiss-German surnames

ru:Моргенталер